The 1972 NASCAR Winston Cup Series was the 24th season of professional stock car racing in the United States and the 1st modern-era NASCAR Cup series season. The season began on Sunday January 23 and ended on Sunday November 12. Richard Petty won his second consecutive Winston Cup Championship and fourth overall. Larry Smith was named NASCAR Rookie of the Year.

This season is considered to be the first of NASCAR's "modern era". The number of races was reduced from 48 to 31, all dirt tracks were removed from the schedule, and a minimum race distance of 250 miles (402 km) was established for oval tracks.

Schedule

Season recap

Notes:
Winston Western 500: Petty makes his debut under STP sponsorship.
Texas World Speedway held two NASCAR races for the only time.

Race summaries
Western 500 Richard Petty and Bobby Allison made important debuts in their careers - Petty debuted under the sponsorship of STP while Allison was making his maiden voyage with the Richard Howard Chevrolet under Junior Johnson's control.  A. J. Foyt won the pole in the Purolator Mercury but fell out with transmission failure.   Allison started 16th but stormed through the field and led 102 laps before falling to second at the end.  Fog shortened the race to 149 laps as Petty led 37 of the final 39 laps, driving for the final time in an all-blue racecar.

Daytona 500 Foyt was unchallenged after Petty fell out with engine failure 80 laps into the 500 and cruised to his only Daytona 500 win and first win at the track since 1965.  Petty led 31 laps, Foyt 167, and Bobby Allison led two, indicative of the slump in competitive depth of the series with the withdrawal of the factories from participation.  Bobby Isaac won the pole in Harry Hyde's Dodge but the engine soured on the start and Isaac finished 33rd, while Buddy Baker crashed with Walter Ballard, who flipped in the trioval grass.

Richmond 500 Petty, Allison, and Isaac led all 500 laps and finished  1-2-3; Isaac though was seven laps down while Dave Marcis and Bill Dennis finished in the top five, both at least twelve laps down.

Miller 500 Ontario Motor Speedway hosted NASCAR for the second straight year and the battle was between Foyt, Petty, Baker, Allison, and Isaac, while West Coast ace Ray Elder and Benny Parsons also led.   51 cars started with over 30 additional entries sent home after qualifying.  Isaac crashed with Mark Donohue 45 laps in ("it's a new car and it's totaled out," said the dejected Isaac) while Petty lost a lap on a botched pitstop; he push-drafted Baker and Allison to keep them challenging Foyt ("Foyt was ridiculously faster than my Chevy down the straights," Allison said), but the #21 was too much and Foyt took what would be his final NASCAR win.

Carolina 500 Bobby Allison won the pole but had to start 39th in the field at North Carolina Motor Speedway after changing tires following qualifying.  He stormed through the field to lead 260 laps, but at Lap 345 his engine failed.  Isaac led 210 laps for the win, only his third big-track Grand National win and what would be his final career Grand National win.  The race occurred two days following the birth of future cup champion Matt Kenseth.

Atlanta 500 Working to solve the engine issues plaguing the team, Junior Johnson began using Union aviation oil for the #12's engines.   Bobby Allison won the pole and engaged in a race-long duel with Bobby Isaac; he escaped a hard crash with Ron Keselowski.  Late in the race A. J. Foyt stormed to the front but Allison grabbed the lead with four laps to go and edged Foyt and Isaac for the first superspeedway win for Chevrolet in some eight years.

Rebel 400 The Wood Brothers hired David Pearson to drive their #21 with A. J. Foyt having to serve his Indycar commitments.  Pearson responded by leading 202 laps and winning for the first time since March 1971.  Richard Petty finished a lap down in second; the 1-2 finish began one of the most celebrated periods in NASCAR history.  Bobby Allison led 29 laps but finished a very distant (15 laps down) seventh.  Joe Frasson finished third.

Gwyn Staley 400 Petty, Allison, and Bobby Isaac dominated the race and finished 1-2-3.  Petty led the last 25 laps after a late tire change where his team put on "gumballs" (softer compound tires).  The racing between the three became heated during the day, Petty calling it "a wing-doolie" of a race.

Virginia 500 The Wood Brothers usually entered only at Martinsville for a short track effort and David Pearson led 102 laps but his transmission broke while leading and he was done with thirty laps to go; he still finished eighth.  Bobby Allison won the pole and led 27 laps to finish second; Bobby Isaac led 268 laps but blew his engine while leading and finished 19th.  As a result Richard Petty despite being on seven cylinders had his fourth win of the season.

Winston 500 The lead changed 53 times as Isaac, Pearson, Buddy Baker, and Petty battled with Fred Lorenzen, driving a Hoss Ellington #28.  Bobby Allison led early but fell out with engine failure.  Petty cut a tire late and lost a lap, and coming to the white flag Isaac was sideslammed by lapped traffic, giving Pearson the lead for the win, his second in the Wood Brothers Mercury.

World 600 Bobby Allison won the pole (the second straight 600 pole for the racecar owned by track promoter Richard Howard) and led 239 laps, but blew both right side tires with 30 laps to go and Buddy Baker took the win.  Richard Petty and Bobby Isaac fell out with engine failures as did Wendell Scott, driving a second Chevrolet out of Junior Johnson's shop.

Mason-Dixon 500 Allison and Petty finished 1-2 after leading 492 of 500 laps; Benny Parsons and Dean Dalton were the only other leaders.

Motor State 400 David Pearson led 154 laps in an easy win, finishing sixteen seconds ahead of Bobby Allison and half a lap ahead of Richard Petty.  Pete Hamilton drove a Jim Ruggles Plymouth and raced with the leaders before falling out in the final 50 laps.

Lone Star 500 Petty battled Bobby Isaac in 100-degree heat at Texas World Speedway before Isaac faltered and Petty beat Bobby Allison by a full lap; Petty held a slender point lead over James Hylton, who had come under fire earlier in the season for leading the points race despite finishing behind Petty and Allison almost every race.  Privateer Richard Childress was involved in a bizarre crash when he spun in Leonard Faustina's oil and flipped into a ditch.

Firecracker 400 The finish turned into an exciting three-car shootout between David Pearson, Petty, and Allison.  Petty tried to muscle past Pearson up high on the homestretch but came six feet short, with Allison hard on Pearson's trunk at the stripe.  Coo Coo Marlin finished fourth after being briefly detained by Daytona police three days prior when a bar brawl accidentally swept up Marlin's wife Eula Faye.

Northern 300 Bobby Allison edged Bobby Isaac in what turned out to be the last Winston Cup Grand National race at Trenton Speedway.  Richard Petty stalled on pit road and lost a lap, while privateer Dave Marcis timed fifth and led one lap before hitting the wall.

Dixie 500 Allison and David Pearson led 285 of 328 laps but Allison took his third big-track win of the season when Pearson slowed with a souring engine, with Richard Petty a distant second.

Talladega 500 James Hylton edged out Ramo Stott in the biggest upset of the season after 32 of 50 entries failed to finish the race.  The top qualifiers crashed out on Lap 22 when Joe Frasson blew a tire while running second; he and the other top qualifiers were using a new Goodyear compound, and the angered Frasson said the new tires "weren't worth a damn."  Hylton was using year-old rubber; "I was going with the old tire anyway," he said after his second career win and first on a superspeedway.

Yankee 400 The financially troubled Michigan International Speedway held its final NASCAR race under its initial ownership aegis on August 20, and David Pearson got into a late duel with Bobby Allison in the final 27 laps, edging Allison by one car length.   Pearson won despite the alternator souring; "I was scared the final 40 laps ... I expected (the engine) to quit any lap."

Southern 500 Bobby Allison battled David Pearson for virtually the entire 500 miles; they led 352 laps between them and at one point Pearson grabbed the lead from Allison by diving five abreast under some seven lapped cars on the frontstretch.  Allison took the win with six laps to go.  Richard Petty finished seven laps down due to repeated blistered tires.  Buddy Baker and Bobby Isaac were eliminated in separate crashes; Baker was tabbed to drive a second Harry Hyde Dodge as Petty Enterprises could not offer him more starts in their #11 Dodge; Isaac, who'd struggled in the primary Hyde Dodge #71 all season, quit the team, saying they were not up to preparing two cars given the constant problems preparing one.

Capital City 500 Buddy Baker was hired to replace Bobby Isaac in Harry Hyde's #71 and led one lap, but was eliminated in the crash that signalled the detonation of the Richard Petty-Bobby Allison feud that defined the season.  Petty and Allison led 498 laps between them, but with nine to go Allison passed Petty; Petty stormed back ahead and sideswiped Allison entering Three; Allison hammered Petty and Petty shot hard into the guardrail coming out of Four, collecting Baker and getting off the ground atop the guardrail.  Shockingly Petty slid back onto all four wheels still in the lead, holding on to win over half a lap.

Delaware 500 David Pearson manhandled the field, leading 350 laps for his sixth win of the season, his highest win total for a season since 1969.  Bobby Allison won the pole but after leading 34 laps fell out with engine failure; with Petty finishing second the points race was getting close to being clinched.

Old Dominion 500 Allison made a determined effort for a ninth win of 1972 as he started on the pole and led 432 laps.  Petty cut a tire and had to pit under green, and when he came back out he was just ahead of Allison.   NASCAR waved the blue "move over" flag but Petty raced Allison to stay on the lead lap.  A yellow put Petty back on the lead lap and he stormed to challenge Allison for the lead.  The two squared off and Petty wrestled away the win with 39 laps to go.

Wilkes 400 The Petty-Allison feud erupted into outright warfare over the final 30 laps.  Allison led 203 laps until the race's lone yellow with 50 to go set off a hard fight between them; the lead changed nine times over the final 38 laps, but in the final three laps the race turned ugly when Allison, blocked off by the lapped car of Vic Parson, plowed full bore into Petty and Parsons and all three hammered the wall, but kept going; Petty crashed into Allison on the final lap and stormed to the win.  An intoxicated fan attacked Petty in victory lane and was clubbed viciously by Maurice Petty using Richard's helmet.

National 500 With prerace chatter buzzing about North Wilkesboro the week before, Allison squared off with Buddy Baker in a frantic final eight laps; the lead bounced around between the two before Allison sideslammed past Baker with four to go.  The Wood Brothers entered two cars, for Pearson and A. J. Foyt, finishing 3-4.

American 500 Allison outlasted Petty, Baker, and Pearson for his tenth win of the season.  The four of them combined to lead 479 laps, while leading nine laps in Hoss Ellington's Chevrolet was Cale Yarborough, trying to return to Grand National racing after two fruitless seasons in USAC Indycars.  The race was the 39th straight race where Allison led at least one lap.

Texas 500 Buddy Baker, A. J. Foyt, and Richard Petty led all 250 laps between them as they dueled for the lead and Baker edged out a close win.  Bobby Allison, his relationship with Junior Johnson deteriorating all season, finished a distant fourth and left the team to re-form his own team, bringing his Coca-Cola sponsorship with him.   The Johnson-wrenched Richard Howard team announced that Cale Yarborough, ninth in the Ellington Chevrolet, would take over the seat for 1973.

Petty won the Grand National title over Allison by 128 points.

Final point standings

Driver's standings

References

External links
http://www.racing-reference.info/raceyear?yr=1972&series=W

 
Winston Cup Series
NASCAR Cup Series seasons